Vatica venulosa is a species of plant in the family Dipterocarpaceae. It is a tree found in Sumatra, Peninsular Malaysia and Borneo. It is a critically endangered species threatened by habitat loss.

References

venulosa
Trees of Sumatra
Trees of Peninsular Malaysia
Trees of Borneo
Critically endangered flora of Asia
Taxonomy articles created by Polbot